The following list of Y-STR markers are commonly used in forensic and genealogical DNA testing.

DYS454 is the least diverse, and multi-copy marker DYS464 is the most diverse Y-STR marker.

The location on the Y-chromosome of numbered Y-STR markers can be roughly given with cytogenetic localization. For example, DYS449 is located at Yp11.2 - meaning the Y-chromosome, petit arm, band 1, sub-band 1, sub-sub-band 2 - DYS449.

Forensic Labs usually use PowerPlex Y (Promega Corporation) and Yfiler (Applied Biosystems) kits that examine 12 or 17 Y-STRs, respectively.  Genealogical DNA test labs examine up to 700 Y-STRs.

Mutation rates
Mutation rates are those per generation, as estimated in Chandler (2006). The quoted estimated errors are typically +/- 15-20%.  Alternative estimates (for forensic use therefore not all markers are covered) from observed pedigrees are also available at the Y Chromosome Haplotype Reference Database.

It appears that some trinucleotide markers may have much higher mutation rates at some repeat lengths than at others.  For example, variation of the trinucleotide DYS388 is generally very slow in most haplogroups, when it takes the values 11-13.  But there appears to be much greater variation and more rapid mutation in Haplogroup J, where it typically has values 14-18.  Similarly the trinucleotide DYS392 is reported to be "fast" in haplogroups N and Q, where it takes values 14-16 which are rare in other groups.

Y-STR markers

Y-STR allele nomenclatures
DNA testing companies or labs in certain cases use different nomenclatures to designate the same Y-STR allele.  Thus, a conversion must be applied in these cases to accurately compare Y-STR results obtained from different companies. The most common nomenclature is based on guidance provided by NIST for Y-STR markers historically reported differently by various companies. The NIST standard is the proposal of ISOGG (International Society of Genetic Genealogy) for genetic genealogy companies.

Notes and references

 Kayser et al. (2004), A Comprehensive Survey of Human Y-Chromosomal Microsatellites Am. J. Hum. Genet., 74 1183-1197.  NB online only data file

See also
List of Y-DNA single-nucleotide polymorphisms
List of X-STR markers

External links
Y STR fact sheet
Y-DNA Testing Company STR Marker Comparison Chart
SMGF Y Marker Details

DNA
Forensic genetics
Y-STR
Genetic genealogy
Human evolution
Human population genetics